The 2010 Charleston Battery season marked the club's seventeenth year of professional soccer. The team played in the USL Second Division (USL-2), the third tier of the American Soccer Pyramid, having voluntarily self-relegated from the USL First Division at the end of the 2009 season. Charleston played its home games at Blackbaud Stadium on Daniel Island. The team was coached by Michael Anhaeuser, in his sixth year as head coach, and was assisted by former Battery player Ian Fuller. The Battery finished the regular season in first place with a record of 11–4–5, 38 points, and hosted the USL-2 championship match at Blackbaud Stadium on August 28, 2010. Charleston finished the regular season without a home defeat. The Battery defeated the Richmond Kickers 2–1 to win their third league title. Lamar Neagle led the USL-2 in scoring with 13 league goals and was named the league MVP. Battery manager Mike Anhaeuser was named the league's manager of the year.

Preseason 

The Battery began their annual Carolina Challenge Cup tournament with a match against Major League Soccer side Toronto FC.  The Battery played Toronto to a draw, and would go on to lose 1-3 to Real Salt Lake, and 0-2 to D.C. United.

Results

Regular season 

The Battery began the 2010 season with a road match at the Charlotte Eagles, winning 3–2.

Players

Current roster

as of April 27, 2010

Staff

  Michael Anhaeuser Head Coach/General Manager
  Ian Fuller Assistant Coach

References

2010
American soccer clubs 2010 season
2010 in sports in South Carolina